Honoré-Marie-Joseph Duveyrier called Mélesville fils (1820, Paris - 6 February 1904, Cannes) was a 19th-century French playwright. Anne-Honoré-Joseph Duveyrier called Mélesville (1787–1865) was his father

 1855 : Les Deux Gilles, opérette bouffe, Théâtre des Folies-Nouvelles

External links 
 Honoré Marie Joseph Duveyrier-Mélesville (1820-18..) on 

1820 births
1904 deaths
French opera librettists
19th-century French dramatists and playwrights
Writers from Paris